The military history of Greece is the history of the wars and battles that took place in Greece, the Balkans, and the Greek colonies in the Mediterranean Sea and the Black Sea, respectively, since classical antiquity.

List of military encounters

Medieval period 
 Iberian War (526-532)
 Battle of Dara (530)
 Vandalic War (533-534)
 Battle of Ad Decimum (533)
 Battle of Tricamarum (533)
 Gothic War (535-554)
 Battle of Taginae (552)
 Battle of Mons Lactarius (553)
 Arab–Byzantine wars (629–1050)
 Battle of Akroinon
 Siege of Constantinople (674–678)
 Siege of Constantinople (717–718)
 Battle of Lalakaon
 Roman–Persian Wars (92 BC-627)
 Battle of Nineveh (627)
 Byzantine–Bulgarian wars (680-1355)
 Battle of Anchialus (763) 
 Battle of Kleidion (1014)
Siege of Constantinople (1204)
Battle of Pelagonia
 Byzantine–Seljuq wars (1048–1308)
Battle of Philomelion
Siege of Nicaea
Battle of Hyelion and Leimocheir
Siege of Trebizond (1205–06)
Battle of Antioch on the Meander
 Byzantine–Ottoman Wars (1265–1453)
Siege of Constantinople (1422)
Fall of Constantinople (1453)

Ottoman Greece
 Battle of Lepanto (1571)
 Epirus peasant revolts (1600), (1611)
 Morean War (1684–1699)
 Orlov Revolt (1770)
 Ottoman invasion of Mani (1770)
 Siege of Kastania (1770)
 Battle of Chesma (1770)
 Battle of Vromopigada (1770)
 Sfakia revolt (1770)
 Ottoman invasion of Mani (1803)
 Souliotes
 Souliote War (1803)
 Ottoman invasion of Mani (1807)
 Ottoman invasion of Mani (1815)

19th century
Greek War of Independence (1821–1829)
Siege of Tripolitsa
Battle of Gravia Inn
Battle of Dervenakia
First Siege of Missolonghi
Second Siege of Missolonghi
Battle of Vasilika
Battle of Dervenakia
Ottoman–Egyptian invasion of Mani
Epirus Revolt of 1854
Cretan Revolt (1866–69)
Epirus Revolt of 1878
Battle of Mouzaki
Greco-Turkish War (1897)

20th century 
First Balkan War (1912–1913)
Battle of Sarantaporo
Battle of Yenidje
Battle of Pente Pigadia
Himara revolt of 1912
Battle of Elli
Capture of Korytsa
Battle of Lemnos (1913)
Battle of Bizani
Second Balkan War (1913)
World War I (1917–1918)
Balkans Campaign
Macedonian Front
Allied expedition to the Ukraine
Greco-Turkish War (1919-1922)
Battle of Afyonkarahisar-Eskişehir
World War II
Greco-Italian War (1940–1941)
Battle of Greece (1941)
Battle of Crete  (1941)
First Battle of El Alamein  (1942)
Second Battle of El Alamein  (1942)
Invasion of Normandy  (1944)
Greek Civil War (1945–1949)
Korean War (1950–1953)
Kosovo Force

21st century 
Afghanistan  (2001–present)
2011 Libyan civil war

List of fortifications in Greece

Medieval period

Byzantine 
Monemvasia
Mistra
Castle of Zarnata

Frankish and Crusader 
Passavas
Beaufort
Tigani
Grand Magne, among several castles referred to as Kastro tis Orias
Kelefa

Venetian 
Kastro Larissa at Argos
Palamidi at Nafplio

Ottoman

Modern

American 
NSA Souda Bay

British

German (World War II-period)

Greek 
Metaxas Line

Italian (World War II and Dodecanese protectorate)

List of Greek military institutions 
Hellenic Military Academy
Hellenic Naval Academy
Hellenic Air Force Academy

List of military alliances

Byzantine 
 Goths
 Varangians
 Bulgarians
 Armenians
 Italian city-states
 Rus' people
 Alans
 Republic of Venice

Modern 
 Russian empire
 United Kingdom
 France
 Balkan League
 Allies of World War I
 Allies of World War II
 United States
 NATO
 United Nations
 Cyprus
 European Union

See also

Military of Greece
History of the Hellenic Army
History of the Hellenic Navy
History of the Hellenic Air Force
List of wars involving Greece